Otley is a civil parish in the metropolitan borough of the City of Leeds, West Yorkshire, England.  It contains 152 listed buildings that are recorded in the National Heritage List for England. Of these, one is listed at Grade I, the highest of the three grades, two are at Grade II*, the middle grade, and the others are at Grade II, the lowest grade.  The parish contains the market town of Otley and the surrounding countryside.  Most of the listed buildings are in the town, and consist of houses, cottages and associated structures, shops, public houses, and commercial buildings.  The other listed buildings include churches, chapels and items in churchyards, farmhouses and farm buildings, buildings associated with a former mill, public buildings, schools, milestones, former workhouse buildings, a clock tower, a war memorial and garden, and telephone kiosks.


Key

Buildings

See also

References

Citations

General sources

Lists of listed buildings in West Yorkshire
Listed